Paradise Lost is an English gothic metal band that formed in 1988 in Halifax, considered to be among the pioneers of the death-doom genre, and regarded as the main influence for the later gothic metal movement. Bands that have cited Paradise Lost as an influence, or have covered them, include My Dying Bride, Anathema, The Gathering, Amorphis, Cradle of Filth, Katatonia, Moonspell, Lacuna Coil, HIM, Nightwish and many others. As of 2005, Paradise Lost have sold over two million albums worldwide.

Their line-up has remained stable for such a long-standing heavy metal band, consisting of singer Nick Holmes, guitarists Greg Mackintosh and Aaron Aedy, and bassist Steve Edmondson. Holmes and Mackintosh are the principal composers, with almost all of the band's songs credited to them. During the years, the band has only changed drummers.

History

Early years and Peaceville Records (1988–1991)
After their formation in 1988, Paradise Lost released three cassette demos, Paradise Lost, Frozen Illusion, and Plains of Desolation, before being signed to Peaceville Records in 1989. They recorded their debut album, Lost Paradise, at Academy Music Studio in December of that year. The album was released in February 1990.

In November 1990, Paradise Lost returned to Academy Music Studio to record their second album, Gothic, which was released in March 1991. The band began to move away from the death/doom sound of their previous releases by adding keyboards and female vocal accompaniments.

Music for Nations (1992–1998)

Paradise Lost left Peaceville and were signed to the Music for Nations label and released Shades of God in July 1992. The band's musical approach continued to evolve with this album as evidenced by the addition of quieter passages in the song's compositions, the softening of vocalist Nick Holmes's death grunt, and Gregor Mackintosh's incorporation of acoustic guitar to his sound. The album contained the song "As I Die", later released as a single/EP.

In the summer of 1993, the band recorded their fourth album, Icon, released in September of the same year. The band continued to develop their sound away from their doom roots and more towards the dynamics and sound of "As I Die" from their previous album. On Icon, Nick Holmes abandoned his death grunt and started using a "James Hetfield-style bark". It was after this album, in December 1994, that original member Matthew Archer quit and was replaced by drummer Lee Morris.

The band entered the studio in January 1995 to record their fifth and most successful album, Draconian Times, which was released in June 1995. Mackintosh says about Draconian Times, "that it's the album by which everything else we do gets judged. Rightly so, as it's the backbone of our career and sound." The album charted in the Top 20 album chart in a number of countries including the UK and Germany.

Following the success of Draconian Times, and after four years of continuous touring, the band began to get bored with their signature sound and started to experiment with Depeche Mode-esque synth-pop and electronica. This new direction shaped their next album One Second, released in 1997, and was most epitomised by the lead single, "Say Just Words". The album was one of the band's most successful releases, particularly in Northern Europe, cracking the German, Swedish, and Finnish top ten charts.

EMI (1999–2001)
The band moved to EMI Electrola in Germany for its next album, Host, released in 1999, on which they continued to experiment with new sounds, appearing to shed their metal roots. While this album continued to alienate their traditional fanbase in places like the UK, it was their highest charting album in Germany, entering at number 4 on the Album Chart.

On the next album, 2001's Believe in Nothing, Paradise Lost continued this synth direction but adding rock elements to the music, forcibly by EMI at the time. Due to the loss of creative control, Mackintosh said that the album "doesn't really exist for him".

GUN Records (2002–2005)
In May 2002, the band signed to GUN Records, and on the album that followed, Symbol of Life, the metallic roots of the band began to resurface; the band decided to work with producer Rhys Fulber to reestablish their metal sound. The album included guest musicians Devin Townsend, Jamie Muhoberac, and Lee Dorrian.

In March 2004, Lee Morris left the band due to "personal and musical differences" and was replaced by Jeff Singer.

Paradise Lost released their tenth, eponymous album in 2005, also on GUN Records.

Century Media (2006–2016)

The eleventh album, In Requiem, was released in the spring of 2007 on Century Media; it was generally well-accepted and highly rated by both critics and fans, pleased to see the band returning to their heavier, gothic metal sound similar to that of earlier albums like Draconian Times. The full-length was preceded by a single, "The Enemy" and on the single, Singer was finally listed as a permanent band member. In a recent video interview, Mackintosh and Holmes revealed that Singer had already auditioned for the band when Archer left, but they chose Morris instead because Singer "had a pink drumkit".

In November 2007, Century Media released the DVD Over The Madness, which documents the impact Paradise Lost has had on gothic metal and provides insight into the mindset and workings of Paradise Lost. Disc 2 includes further interviews, rehearsal footage, plus backstage and memorabilia sections.

On 13 August 2008, drummer Jeff Singer announced his departure from the band on the Paradise Lost official website. He wanted to be with his family, had an upcoming job, and the then-upcoming South American tour would interfere with that. As a result, Paradise Lost had to cancel the South American tour dates that they had planned. Soon after, on 28 August 2008, the Paradise Lost official website announced that the canceled South American tour has been reconfirmed and that Mark Heron from Oceansize would take over on drums.

At the beginning of 2009, Paradise Lost recorded an album with producer Jens Bogren at Fascination Street Studios in Örebro, Sweden. At the time there was no full-time replacement for Jeff Singer and drums were played by Swedish drummer Peter Damin. On 16 March 2009, when recording for the album was already finished, the band recruited Adrian Erlandsson (At the Gates, ex-Cradle of Filth) as a full-time drummer for the band.

On 18 June 2009, Paradise Lost officially announced Faith Divides Us – Death Unites Us as the title of their album to be released on Century Media Records on 25 September 2009 in Germany, on 28 September 2009 in the rest of Europe and on 6 October 2009 in the US.

Paradise Lost headlined the Jägermeister Stage at Ozzfest 2010 on 18 September 2010.

In late 2011, Paradise Lost began recording its 13th studio album Tragic Idol in The Chapel Studios in Lincolnshire. The album was released on 23 April 2012.. Adrian Erlandsson was unable to play a few live shows for this album so the band got Jeff Singer again to fill in.

Paradise Lost performed some of their songs at the Metal Hammer Golden Gods awards with Cristina Scabbia on Paradise Lost's song "Say Just Words" and with Gus G. of a Black Sabbath cover, "Into the Void".

On 15 August 2013, the cover and artwork were released for their compilation album of b-sides titled Tragic Illusion 25. From September to October 2014, some of the songs from the album were released, such as a new song entitled Loneliness Remains, and older songs that were remade such as Our Savior 2013 from Lost Paradise and the self-titled song Gothic 2013 from Gothic. The album was released on 5 November 2013.

On 27 October 2013, it was announced that the writing for the 14th studio album will begin after their 25th-anniversary tour and the recording to the album will start in June 2014. On 29 December 2014, it was revealed that The Plague Within would be the title for upcoming album. On 26 January 2015, the release date for 2 June 2015 was announced, along with the producer, Jaime Gomez Arellano and the recording location of Orgone Studios, London. Speaking to Rock Sins, Nick Holmes stated that the new album would have elements of all previous Paradise Lost material including a return to the death/doom of their early output, stating that "there's some songs that could've been written in 1989, a couple of really old school doom/death songs which are gonna surprise a couple of people when they hear it." The Plague Within is considered by many traditional fans to be their best and most complete album in many years, as well as being a true return to their signature sound.

Nuclear Blast (2016–present)
On 1 September 2017, Paradise Lost released their 15th studio album, Medusa. The band continued their return to a much heavier, more doomier sound. Singer Nick Holmes said "...definitely our heaviest album; the heaviest we've done." Medusa was well received by fans and critics alike.

2018 marked the band's 30th anniversary and was celebrated through select dates around UK and mainland Europe, including their first gig in the hometown of Halifax, as well as a South and North American tour with Solstafir and The Atlas Moth. In November 2019, Decibel Books issued the band's authorized biography, No Celebration: The Official Story of Paradise Lost. The book was authored by American journalist David E. Gehlke.

In March 2020, Nuclear Blast announced the release of the group's 16th studio album, Obsidian, on 15 May. Nick Holmes described it as "one of the most eclectic albums we have done in some time, we have miserable songs, sad songs, slow songs and faster songs. Did I mention miserable?". First single, Fall from Grace premiered on 20 March, along with a music video. The next year, the band released a live album titled At the Mill; while the album was recorded live, the band played with no audience due to the COVID-19 pandemic. On September 7, 2022, drummer Waltteri Väyrynen was announced to have departed from the band, who found a temporary replacement in drummer Guido Montanarini. Montanarini also performs with Paradise Lost guitarist/keyboardist Gregor Mackintosh in the band Strigoi. Väyrynen since joined Opeth as their permanent drummer.

In October 2022, Mackintosh and Holmes announced the formation of Host, a synth-pop side-project that is "taking the concept of what we attempted to do on the Paradise Lost album Host but approaching it in a modern context". A music video for the single "Tomorrow's Sky" was uploaded to the label's YouTube page on 21 October 2022. Their debut album, entitled IX, was released on 24 February 2023 via Nuclear Blast.

Style and influences 
Paradise Lost's sound has been described as death metal, death doom or doom metal. They are also considered as a precursor and the creator of gothic metal, with the release of Gothic in 1991. Holmes stated: "The key with death metal singing is you’ve got to sing quietly". He cited Iron Maiden's singer Bruce Dickinson in his main influences along with Metallica for their Master of Puppets album. Holmes said that the band's early influences were Black Sabbath and Dead Can Dance: "the old Black Sabbath, that’s, to me, the inspiration for when we started the band".  Mackintosh said that he took inspiration from "Tony Iommi a lot" and also "Johnny Marr [...] Jimi Hendrix and classic music", mixing all these styles with metal music and rock music. Mackintosh also stated that gothic rock was also an influence with bands like "Southern Death Cult and early Sisters of Mercy, Siouxsie and the Banshees, early Cure".

The band experienced a considerable shift in style between 1997 and 2002, on their albums One Second through Symbol of Life; One Second saw the heavy use of electronics and keyboards, and Holmes using clean vocals, with Host moving even more towards synthpop / dark wave. Believe in Nothing moved the band to a more alternative rock direction, with Symbol of Life reestablishing a heavier gothic metal tone. Both Mackintosh and Holmes expressed ambivalence about this period of the band, citing personal problems within the band at the time.

Band members

Current
 Nick Holmes – vocals (1988–present)
 Gregor Mackintosh – lead guitar (1988–present); keyboards (1996–present)
 Aaron Aedy – rhythm guitar (1988–present)
 Stephen Edmondson – bass (1988–present)

Past

Drummers
 Matthew Archer (1988–1994)
 Lee Morris (1994–2004)
 Jeff Singer (2004–2008)
 Adrian Erlandsson (2009–2015)
 Waltteri Väyrynen (2015–2022)

Session members
 Mark Heron – drums (2008–2009)
 Peter Damin – drums (2009)
 Milton "Milly" Evans – lead guitar (1999, 2009–2010), keyboards, backing vocals (2011)
Guido Montanarini – drums (2022–present)

Timeline

Discography

Studio albums
 Lost Paradise (1990)
 Gothic (1991)
 Shades of God (1992)
 Icon (1993)
 Draconian Times (1995)
 One Second (1997)
 Host (1999)
 Believe in Nothing (2001)
 Symbol of Life (2002)
 Paradise Lost (2005)
 In Requiem (2007)
 Faith Divides Us – Death Unites Us (2009)
 Tragic Idol (2012)
 The Plague Within (2015)
 Medusa (2017)
 Obsidian (2020)

References

External links

 
 
 

English electronic rock musical groups
English death metal musical groups
English doom metal musical groups
English gothic metal musical groups
Musical groups established in 1988
Century Media Records artists
Metal Mind Productions artists
Nuclear Blast artists
Music for Nations artists
GUN Records artists